The 1922 Akron Pros season was their third in the league. The team failed to improve on their previous output of 8–3–1, winning only three games. They finished tenth in the league.

Schedule

Standings

References

Akron Pros seasons
Akron Pros
Akron Pros